Emolument is a crowdsourced salary comparison website created in 2012 by Thomas Drewry, Olivier Beau de Loménie and Alice Leguay. It allows its contributors to compare their salary to aggregated entries of other Emolument users, in order to help them negotiate a salary raise, evaluate an offer of employment or change locations.

As of September 2015, Emolument.com had gathered 100,000 entries, each of them automatically and manually verified in order to preserve the accuracy of the data, according to the website.

While Emolument.com is opened to all industries, it is mostly used by Finance, Consultancy and Tech professionals and therefore is often used as a source by newspapers for studies on Banks, Tech firms or Consultancy companies.

Emolument.com also regularly publishes league tables of best paying universities.

In July 2015, Emolument announced it had raised £1.4 million in funding from 10 angel investors, enabling it to pursue an aggressive user acquisition strategy targeted at financial and professional services globally to further establish Emolument.com as the leading user-generated remuneration data platform in these sectors.

References

External links
  Emolument Website

Online databases
Companies based in the City of Westminster
British companies established in 2012